This page includes the discography of the Serbian artist Marija Šerifović.

Albums

Studio albums

Compilation albums

Singles

Music videos

References

External links
Official Website
Marija Šerifović on Discogs

Discographies of Serbian artists
Pop music discographies